Crakehall railway station was a railway station that served the village of Crakehall, North Yorkshire, England.

History
Opened by the Bedale and Leyburn Railway, it became part of the London and North Eastern Railway during the Grouping of 1923. The line then passed on to the Eastern Region of British Railways on nationalisation in 1948. It was then closed by British Railways in April 1954.

The site today
Track still passes through the station site, providing rail access for the Wensleydale Railway which operates west from Leeming Bar.  The crossing is now manually operated by a crossing keeper when the heritage line is operating.  The station building remains intact and is used as a private house.

References

External links 

 Crakehall station video footage
 Crakehall station on navigable 1947 O. S. map
 Crakehall station homepage

Disused railway stations in North Yorkshire
Railway stations in Great Britain opened in 1856
Railway stations in Great Britain closed in 1917
Railway stations in Great Britain opened in 1921
Railway stations in Great Britain closed in 1954
Former North Eastern Railway (UK) stations
Wensleydale